The 1.-class torpedo boat was a designation in the Scandinavian countries for a type of fast steam ships on more than 80 tons .

Royal Danish Navy
 
 1879 Torpedobaad Nr. 4
 1880 Torpedobaad Nr. 5
 1881 Torpedobaad Nr. 6
 1882 
 1882 
 1882 
 1883 
 1884 
 1887 
 1887 
 1888 
 1888 
 1891-1919 
 1893 
 1893 
 1896 
 1896/98 
 1896/98 
 1907-1932

Royal Norwegian Navy
 The Royal Norwegian Navy had ten torpedo boats built from 1892. 6 of which were still active at the German invasion of Norway in 1940.

Royal Swedish Navy
 
HSwMS Komet (1896-1916), V20 (1916-1926))
HSwMS Blixt (1898-1921), V27 (1921-1947)
HSwMS Meteor (1899-1921), V28 (1921-1947)
HSwMS Stjerna (1899-1921), V29 (1921-1937)
HSwMS Orkan (1900-1921), V30 (1921-1947)
HSwMS Bris (1900-1921), V31 (1921-1937)
HSwMS Vind (1900-1921), V32 (1921-1937)
HSwMS Virgo (1902-1921), V33 (1921-1941)
HSwMS Mira (1902)-1921), V34 (1921-1943)
HSwMS Orion (1903-1921), V35 (1921-1947)
HSwMS Sirius (1903-1921), V36 (1921-1942)
HSwMS Kapella (1904-1921), V37 (1921-1937)
HSwMS Plejad (1905-1926), V38 (1926-1930)
HSwMS Iris (1909-1928), V39 (1928-1947)
HSwMS Thetis (1909-1928), V40 (1928-1947)
HSwMS Spica (1908-1928), V41 (1928-1947)
HSwMS Astrea (1909-1928), V42 (1928-1947)
HSwMS Antares (1909-1928), V43 (1928-1947)
HSwMS Arcturus (1909-1928), V44 (1928-1940)
HSwMS Altair (1909-1928), V45 (1928-1947)
HSwMS Argo (1909-1928), V46 (1928-1940)
HSwMS Polaris (1910-1928), V47 (1928-1947)
HSwMS Perseus (1910-1928), V48 (1928-1947)
HSwMS Regulus (1910-1928), V49 (1928-1944)
HSwMS Rigel (1910-1928), V50 (1928-1944)
HSwMS Castor (1909-1928), V51 (1928-1940)
HSwMS Pollux (1909-1928), V52 (1928-1940)
HSwMS Vega (1911-1928), V53 (1928-1941)
HSwMS Vesta (1911-1928), V54 (1928-1941)

See also
 , of an earlier class later known as the 2.-class torpedo boats

References

Torpedo boat classes